Luggage Express is a door-to-door luggage delivery service that was launched by parent company, Universal Express.  Luggage Express arranged to pick up travelers' baggage at their home or office prior to a trip and have it waiting at the hotel or resort in the destination city. 

In 2007, Universal Express collapsed as a result of CEO, Richard Altomare issuing billions of illegal and unregistered shares of stock.  A receiver was appointed federal judge at the request of the S.E.C to oversee the divestiture of assets.

Ownership 
Luggage Express began service in 1988 and operated under the Universal Express umbrella until the company's collapse in 2007.

In 2007, Luggage Express was sold to Sports Express, LLC, a competitive luggage and sports equipment delivery company based in Durango, Colorado.

Sports Express and all related brands were acquired by First Luggage, a luggage shipping company based in the United Kingdom, in 2008.

In 2009, Luggage Forward acquired the Sports Express, Luggage Express, and Virtual Bellhop brands from First Luggage.

External links

References

Logistics companies of the United States